Abell 2065 is a highly concentrated galaxy cluster in the constellation of Corona Borealis containing over 400 member galaxies, the brightest of which are 16th magnitude. The cluster is more than one billion light-years from Earth. On a larger scale still, Abell 2065, along with Abell 2061, Abell 2067, Abell 2079, Abell 2089, and Abell 2092, make up the Corona Borealis Supercluster.

References

Corona Borealis
2065
Galaxy clusters